The Gold Creek Dam is an earth-fill embankment dam with an un-gated spillway across the Gold Creek that is located in the South East region of Queensland, Australia. The main purpose of the dam is for potable water supply of the Brisbane region. The resultant reservoir is called the Gold Creek Reservoir.

Location and features

Unlike Enoggera, the Gold Creek site could supply water to the most elevated parts of the city.

The  dam wall holds back the  reservoir when at full capacity. Initially managed by the Brisbane City Council up until 2008, the dam is now managed by Seqwater.

Construction
The Gold Creek Dam was the second oldest large dam in Queensland. Construction of the dam was approved in 1881; surveying began in the same year and was completed by April 1882. The dam wall was built between 1882 and 1885. Due to a lack of water, testing of the facilities was not completed until 1886. Construction was more difficult than expected and caused cost overruns and delays, which led to criticism of the Board of Waterworks. The construction tender was won by Ross and Dunbar based on designs developed by J. B. Henderson.

Unusual spillway
Originally an unlined chute, the dam spillway was damaged during floods in early 1890. It was replaced by an un-reinforced concrete stepped spillway the first of its type in the world and the precursor of modern roller compacted concrete (RCC) stepped spillways. The dam and its spillway system were refurbished several times including in 1974 and 2004. Most of the 1890 concrete stepped spillway cascade is still in use.

Water supply
The council had received complaints about the quality of water it was delivering from as early as 1871. Although water supplied from Gold Creek was deemed to be perfectly drinkable in 1883, dry spring and summer weather resulted in the water being described as discoloured, tainted and foul-smelling. In 1885, the construction of tanks was recommended to allow aeration and sedimentation. After Gold Creek dam was constructed filtration was also recommended. However nothing was initiated, partly due to the lack of a suitable location to treat water from both dams, and because wet weather in 1888 resulted in the number of complaints dropping to just a few.

Access

Gold Creek Dam is reached by traveling to the end of Gold Creek Road, off Brookfield Road in Brookfield. From here to the Dam, Gold Creek Road criss-crosses Gold Creek; it is winding and somewhat narrow but generally flat and suitable for cycling or walking. A steep walking track gives access to the top of the dam at the eastern end; alternatively a gentle vehicle track gives access to the western end of the top of the dam.

Recreation
At the foot of the dam is a public toilet and an information board. The board shows a map of the dam and the walking track.  On water activities are not permitted, even though the water is no longer used for supply.

Walking tracks
It starts and ends at the dam and circumnavigates the reservoir. It is suitable for running, walking, and mountain biking by a capable rider but not horse riding. Taken clockwise and starting on the western end of the top of the dam, the first  (approx) is generally a narrow winding track clinging to steep hillside with some climb. The next  (approx) appears to be formed by repeated use of a quad bike and is generally wider and flatter. The next  (approx) return path along the eastern side of the reservoir is narrow and fairly rugged, climbing and dropping repeatedly. The final  (approx) back to the foot of the dam is well-formed, reasonably wide and gentle with formed steps on the steeper sections. The track finishes from the east by traversing the bottom of the spillway; it is difficult to make out from the foot of the dam. A  side-track visiting a Hoop Pine plantation is described on the information board, which also describes various notable sights on the track. As of March 2010 lantana growth has made these tough to spot. The track is very overgrown and little used and its route can no longer be seen at the northernmost point. This makes circumnavigation of the dam very difficult.

Walking and riding tracks which travel deep into Brisbane Forest Park also begin here. Gold Creek Reservoir is home to the Pinnacles Classic, a small trail running event held in mid-April which uses a hilly, roughly rectangular  course which utilises Gold Creek Boundary Break, South Boundary Road and the Gold Creek Trail, starting and finishing at the gate at Gold Creek Road. The event reverses direction each year, with clockwise races held in even numbered years.

Gallery

See also

List of dams in Queensland

References

External links
 Gold Creek dam and its historical stepped spillway system (Cick PROCEED at the UQ-ITS advisory webpage)
 
 Photo of the spillway
 
 

Gold Creek Reservoir
Geography of Brisbane
Buildings and structures in Brisbane
Dams in Queensland
Embankment dams
Earth-filled dams
Dams completed in 1882
1882 establishments in Australia